Septaria porcellana is a species of freshwater snail, a gastropod mollusk in the family Neritidae. 

Subspecies
 Septaria porcellana borbonica (Bory de Saint-Vincent, 1804)
 Septaria porcellana porcellana (Linnaeus, 1758)

Distribution
The geographical distribution of Septaria porcellana includes India, the Philippines, Indonesia, New Guinea and New Caledonia.

Description
The length of the shell attains 13.1 mm.

Life cycle

Human use
This species is sold in the ornamental pet trade for use in freshwater aquaria.

References

 Kerr, A. M. 2013. Annotated Checklist of the Aquatic snails of the Mariana Islands, Micronesia. University of Guam Marine Laboratory Technical Report 147: 1-18
 Eichhorst T.E. (2016). Neritidae of the world. Volume 2. Harxheim: Conchbooks. Pp. 696-1366
 Benthem Jutting, W. S. S. van. (1958). Non-marine Mollusca of the island of Misool. Nova Guinea: A Journal of Botany, Zoology, Anthropology, Ethnography, Geology and Palaeontology of the Papuan Region. 9 (1): 293–338.

External links
 Linnaeus, C. (1758). Systema Naturae per regna tria naturae, secundum classes, ordines, genera, species, cum characteribus, differentiis, synonymis, locis. Editio decima, reformata [10th revised edition, vol. 1: 824 pp. Laurentius Salvius: Holmiae]
 Sowerby, G. B. I. (1825). A catalogue of the shells contained in the collection of the late Earl of Tankerville: arranged according to the Lamarckian conchological system: together with an appendix, containing descriptions of many new species- London, vii + 92 + xxxiv pp
 Schumacher, C. F. (1817). Essai d'un nouveau système des habitations des vers testacés. Schultz, Copenghagen. iv + 288 pp., 22 pls
 Lesson, R. P. (1831). Chapitre XI. Mollusques, Annélides et Vers; par R.-P. Lesson. pp. 239-456 [15 Nov 1831. In: Lesson R.P. 1830-1831. Voyage autour du monde, Exécuté par Ordre du Roi, sur La Corvette de Sa Majesté, La Coquille, pendant les années 1822, 1823, 1824 et 1825, sous le ministere et conformément aux Instructions de S.E.M. le Marquis de Clermont-Tonnerre, Ministre de la Marine; Et publié sous les auspices de son Excellence Mgr le Cte de Chabrol, Ministre de la Marine et des Colonies, par M.L.I. Duperrey, Capitaine de Frégate, Chevalier de Saint-Louis et Membre de la Légion d'Honneur, Commandant de l'Expedition. Zoologie, par M. Lesson. Tome Second. 1re Partie. Paris, Arthus Bertrand, Libraire-Editeur, Imprimerie de Firmin Didot. pp. 1-471]
 Récluz, C. A. (1842). Prodrome d'une monographie du genre Navicelle. Revue Zoologique par la Société Cuvierienne. 4: 369-382
 Martens, E. von. (1897). Süss- und Brackwasser-Mollusken des Indischen Archipels. Zoologische Ergebnisse Einer Reise in Niederländisch Ost-Indien 4: 1-331, pls 1-12
Abdou, A. (2021). New taxonomic and phylogeographic data on three nominal species of the genus Septaria Férussac, 1807 (Gastropoda: Cycloneritida: Neritidae). Zootaxa. 4915 (1): 28-40.
  Haynes, A. (2001). A revision of the genus Septaria Férussac, 1803 (Gastropoda: Neritimorpha). Annalen des Naturhistorischen Museums in Wien. Serie B für Botanik und Zoologie. 103: 177-229

Neritidae
Gastropods described in 1758
Taxa named by Carl Linnaeus